The British Rail Class 325 is an electric multiple unit (EMU) train owned by and operated for the Royal Mail to carry bulk mail. The class consists of four-car sets with dual-voltage 25kV(AC) and 750V(DC) power. While the Class 325 cabs bear a resemblance to the Networker family of DMUs and EMUs, the Class 325 is based on the Class 319.

History

These units, which were ordered in 1994, were initially given the TOPS classification Class 350 which was changed to Class 325 before the trains entered service.

The 16 units were built at ABB Derby between 1995 and 1996. They are similar to Class 319 units, sharing the same traction equipment and body design, but are fitted with cabs of the same design as the ABB Networker family.

The trains are fitted with large round oleo buffers, and have no gangways between carriages. Each set is made up of four cars, with roller doors in place of sliding ones and no windows. Each car has two roller shutter sliding doors on each side and is designed to hold up to 12tonnes. They have a Brecknell Willis high speed pantograph to pick up power from the  overhead lines, and also a shoe to pick up power off the 750VDC third rail. They cannot work in multiple with any other multiple unit stock, but are fitted with drop-head buck-eye coupling and can therefore be hauled by locomotives. The units were built in such a way that they could easily be converted for passenger use if no longer required for mail services.

They are based at Crewe IEMD – International Electric Maintenance Depot.

, the mockup cab built before the construction of the Class 325s, numbered 325000, is currently on display at the Nene Valley Railway as part of the as-yet-unfinished Night Mail Museum at Overton, having been disposed of from the National Railway Museum.

Operations
At launch, the trains were operated by British Rail's parcel's service, Rail Express Systems (RES). With the Privatisation of British Rail operation was transferred to English Welsh & Scottish Railway. Such work continued alongside Class 86 locomotives up the West Coast Main Line and East Coast Main Line until 2003, when Royal Mail withdrew the postal contracts, resulting in decreasing use until the units entered storage following the end of work.

When First GBRf gained a new contract for mail transport over Christmas 2004, the Class 325s returned to limited work operating in multiple. Work with locomotive haulage also occurred again, powered by GBRf Class 87s.  After a traction reshuffle the Class 325s resumed service with their power cars and without locomotive haulage.

GBRf's contract expired in 2010. A new contract for Royal Mail operations, and responsibility for managing the Class 325 fleet, was won by DB Schenker. , seven trains were to be run a day, between London, Warrington and Glasgow via the West Coast Main Line, with capacity to be flexible as required.  The sets can be worked together to make up four-, eight- or twelve-car trains.

In 2012, unit number 325010, which had been damaged and was stored as a source of spares for the rest of the fleet, was disposed of by scrapping.

From June 2013, DB Schenker re-inaugurated an additional service on the East Coast Main Line from Willesden to Low Fell, just outside Newcastle.

Fleet details

Named units
Named units are as follows: 

 325006: John Grierson

See also

 SNCF TGV La Poste, 270km/h Postal version of the TGV Sud Est used in France.
 ETR 500, in freight operation since October, 2018. Maximum speed is 300 km/h, average speed is 180 km/h.

References

Further reading

325
325
Non-passenger multiple units
Royal Mail
Train-related introductions in 1995
25 kV AC multiple units
750 V DC multiple units
ABB multiple units